Paramor may refer to:

People
 George Paramor (1846-1924), NZ cricket player
 Norrie Paramor (1914-1979), UK musician 
 Richard Paramor, Australian international rower, see List of Commonwealth Games medallists in rowing
 Wendy Paramor (1938-1975), Australian artist

Arts and entertainment
 Mrs. Paramor, a 1923 novel written by Louis Joseph Vance
 Paramor Prize, an artistic prize established by the city of Liverpool, New South Wales, Australia in honour of Wendy Paramor

See also

 
 Paramore (disambiguation)
 Paramour (disambiguation)
 Parramore (disambiguation)
 Par (disambiguation)
 Amor (disambiguation)